Huaycama is a village and municipality within the Ambato Department of Catamarca Province, northwestern Argentina.

References

Populated places in Catamarca Province